James Holland  (born 27 June 1970) is an English author and broadcaster who specialises in the history of World War II. His most recently published written work is 2021's Brothers in Arms: One Legendary Tank Regiment's Bloody War from D-Day to VE-Day, which follows the Sherwood Rangers, a British tank regiment, throughout multiple battles.

Early life and education
Holland was born in Salisbury, Wiltshire. He was educated at Chafyn Grove School, Salisbury, and King's School, Bruton, and in 1992 attained a BA degree in History from St Chad's College, Durham. His elder brother Tom Holland is also a writer and historian.

Career
Holland has written both novels and non-fiction history books focusing on the Second World War, and has presented documentary programming about WWII for television and radio.

He is also the co-founder, co-chair and programme director of the annual Chalke Valley History Festival, which is the largest festival dedicated entirely to history in the UK.

Holland and Al Murray produce the We Have Ways Of Making You Talk podcast.

Non-fiction books
Holland's first historical account of World War II was published in 2003. Fortress Malta – An Island Under Siege, 1940–1943 was favourably reviewed by Nicholas Roe for the Guardian:  "Fortress Malta succeeds brilliantly in showing war's human position. James Holland deftly interweaves the personal histories of pilots, soldiers, submariners, sailors, nurses, office clerks and other civilians. All are brought compellingly to life in a brisk, tightly constructed narrative that has the impetus of first-hand experience."

In 2006, Holland published a study of a selection of young men who reached adulthood during World War II. Twenty-One: Coming of Age in the Second World War (retitled Heroes: The Greatest Generation and the Second World War for the 2007 paperback release) was reviewed by Max Hastings in the Telegraph: "Holland has already achieved a reputation as a fine and perceptive recorder of human experience. Here, he exploits his skills to describe what it is like for very young people to find themselves performing tasks and sometimes assuming responsibilities greater than anything they could have known at 21 in peacetime life."

His 2008 book Italy's Sorrow: A Year of War, 1944–1945 was reviewed by Publishers Weekly, which said: "This is popular history at its very best: exhaustively researched, compellingly written and authoritative".

Historian Saul David, writing in the Telegraph, praised Holland's book The Battle of Britain: Five Months that Changed History, May – October 1940 (2010): "Holland prefers his history to be about people, and his dazzling cast of characters includes civilians and servicemen, men and women, young and old. It may take him more than 300 pages to get to the Battle of Britain proper, yet the pace never flags".

Aviation History magazine called his 2013 history, Dam Busters: The True Story of the Inventors and Airmen Who Led the Devastating Raid to Smash the German Dams in 1943 "painstakingly researched and splendidly told" and said that it was "the definitive book on the subject, deserving a place in the library of any student of the famous raid".

In 2015, The Guardian reviewed the first volume in Holland's planned trilogy, The War in the West, Volume I: Germany Ascendant 1939–1941, with writer Alexander Larman calling it "impeccably researched and superbly written" and saying "Holland’s fascinating saga offers a mixture of captivating new research and well-considered revisionism. The next two volumes should be unmissable." The second volume, The War in the West:The Allies Strike Back, 1941–1943, was published in 2017 and was called by Kirkus Reviews "an expert, anecdote-filled, thoroughly entertaining if heavily British-oriented history of the war’s middle years".

His 2019 book Normandy '44: D-Day and the Battle for France was called "far from the first but among the better histories of the Allied invasion of Europe" by Kirkus Reviews and "an excellent and engrossing new look at the Normandy invasion" by Publishers Weekly.

Holland also writes entries in the Ladybird Expert Series of books for children, with each focused on a particular battle or aspect of World War II. He has said that he plans to write a total of twelve books for the series. He is also an occasional contributor to Britain at War magazine.

Novels
Holland's first novel, The Burning Blue (2004), is about a young fighter pilot who is hiding a family secret. It takes place in the months leading up to and after the start of World War II. Nigel Jones wrote the Guardian review of it and said "[Holland] has joined the few who can bring history to life."

His first novel in a series featuring the exploits of Sgt. Jack Tanner, a soldier in the fictitious WWII unit The King's Own Yorkshire Rangers, was published in 2008. The Odin Mission was favorably reviewed by the Telegraph'''s Roger Perkins, who called it "a meaty, all-action yarn". As of 2019, a total of five Jack Tanner books have been published.

Holland has also written two young adult novels about teenage soldiers taking part in famous World War II battles: Duty Calls: Dunkirk (2011) and Duty Calls: Battle of Britain (2012).

Documentaries
Holland has written and presented a number of documentaries on World War II for BBC Two. Battle of Britain: The Real Story (2010) received a Break-through Talent nomination from the BAFTA TV Craft Awards for its producer/director Aaron Young. Dam Busters: The Race to Smash the German Dams aired in 2011, The Battle for Malta in 2013 and Normandy '44: The Battle Beyond D-Day in 2014.

With his two-part BBC Two documentary Cold War, Hot Jets (2013), he took a rare departure from World War II to focus on the postwar era and the aeronautics race. Reviewing it for the Guardian, Sam Wollaston called it a "rip-roaring documentary."

Starting in 2015, Holland filmed multiple episodes of the PBS documentary series Pritzker Military Presents, produced by the Pritzker Military Museum & Library in Chicago. Two of the episodes were based upon the first two volumes of his War in the West book trilogy: The Rise of Germany, 1939 – 1941 and The Allies Strike Back, 1941–1943, and a third was based upon his 2018 book Big Week: The Biggest Air Battle of World War II. He also appeared on an episode of the National Geographic Channel's Nazi Megastructures, titled 'Hitler's Killer Subs', in 2016.

In 2018, he made a documentary for Dan Snow's on-demand history channel, HistoryHit TV. In Imphal & Kohima: Britain's Greatest Battle, he argued that the simultaneous 1944 Battle of Imphal and Battle of Kohima, in which Allied forces drove back the Japanese attempt to invade India, was Britain's greatest military battle of all time. In 2019, he looked at the use of amphetamines in World War II and how it unleashed the first pharmacological arms race in an episode of the PBS history series Secrets of the Dead, titled World War Speed.

Holland also appeared as one of the team of experts investigating the theory that Adolf Hitler could have survived World War II and escaped to South America, in the History Channel series Hunting Hitler (2015–2018).

In 2019 Holland appeared in the two-part BBC documentary series Lost home movies of Nazi Germany, where he was recorded reacting to personal footage captured in Germany and its occupied territories shortly before and during the Second World War.

Personal life
Holland is honorary secretary and a playing member of Chalke Valley Cricket Club and was instrumental in organising the relocation of the cricket ground from a combined football and cricket ground at the Chalke Valley Sports Centre to a new ground solely for cricket at Butt's Field, Bowerchalke. He contributed a chapter about the creation of the new cricket ground to the book The Authors XI: A Season of English Cricket from Hackney to Hambledon, which was collectively written by members of another cricket team on which he has played, the Authors XI.

In August 2014, he was one of 200 public figures who were signatories to a letter to The Guardian expressing their hope that Scotland would vote to remain part of the United Kingdom in September's referendum on that issue.

He is a Fellow of the Royal Historical Society and a member of both the British Commission for Military History and the Guild of Battlefield Guides. He has his own collection at the Imperial War Museum.

He is the great-nephew of Olympian Charles Holland, the first British cyclist to complete the Tour de France.

Holland lives in Wiltshire with his wife and two children.

Books

Non-fiction for adults
 
 
 
 
 
 
 
 
 
 
 

The War in the West

 

Non-fiction for children
Ladybird Expert series

Novels for adults
 
 

Jack Tanner series

Novels for young adults
 
 

Television BroadcastsThe End of the War in Europe, Victory in Europe (UKTV History, May 2005) Battle of Britain: The Real Story (BBC Two, September 2010)Dam Busters (BBC Two, 8 November 2011)Battle for Malta (BBC Two, 7 January 2013) War Heroes of the Skies (National Geographic Channel, August 2013)Cold War, Hot Jets (BBC Two, 8 November 2013)Normandy '44: The Battle Beyond D-Day (BBC Two, 6 June 2014)Nazi Megastructures – Episode: Hitler's Killer Subs (National Geographic, 2016)Hunting Hitler (History, 2015–2018)Pritzker Military Presents – Episode: 'The War in the West: The Rise of Germany, 1939 – 1941 (PBS, 2015)Pritzker Military Presents – Episode: The War in the West: The Allies Strike Back, 1941–1943  (PBS, 2017)Pritzker Military Presents – Episode: Big Week: The Biggest Air Battle of World War II (PBS, 2018)Imphal & Kohima: Britain's Greatest Battle (History Hit TV, 2018)Hitler's Circle of Evil – 5 Episodes (ZDF, 2018)Secrets of the Dead – Episode: World War Speed (Netflix, 2019)Greatest Events of WW2 in Color – HistorianHitler's Megafortresses (2019) ... HistorianHitler's Flying Forces (2019) ... HistorianHitler's Deadly Tanks (2019) ... HistorianHitler's War at Sea (2019) ... HistorianHitler's Henchmen (2019) ... HistorianBattle for the Pacific (2019) ... HistorianWar on the Eastern Front (2019) ... HistorianNazi War Machines - secrets uncovered (2020) The LuftwaffeThe PanzersThe U-boatsThe Guns''

See also

Alumni of St Chad's College, Durham

References

External links
James Holland's official website

Living people
British non-fiction writers
British television presenters
People educated at Chafyn Grove School
People educated at King's School, Bruton
Alumni of St Chad's College, Durham
1970 births
British male writers
Holland, James
Male non-fiction writers